Sidera Networks is a New York Citybased, privately held, United States owned, telecommunications company that provides fiber optic-based network solutions to the carrier, financial services, education, healthcare, government, legal services and media industries. The company was acquired by Lightower Fiber Networks on April 11, 2013.

Services
Sidera Networks’ suite of facilities-based services includes: 
 Ethernet
 SONET
 Wavelength
 Internet Access
 Colocation
 Custom Private Optical Network
 Dark Fiber Solutions
 Central Office Access
 Managed Services including Network Operations Center, Managed Router and Remote Hands services

History and acquisitions
Sidera Networks began as RCN Corporation, a publicly traded telecommunications company, based out of Herndon, VA. RCN Corporation was founded in 1993 by developer  David McCourt and Peter Kiewit Sons' Inc.

In 1998, RCN Corporation became one of the ten largest Internet service providers in the country after acquiring Virginia-based Erols Internet, Inc. and Boston-based UltraNet Communications to strengthen the data side of its business. That same year, RCN acquired Interport Communications in New York City and Springfield, Massachusetts-based JavaNet, Inc., which linked high schools and colleges to the Internet.

In March 2006, RCN Corporation created the subsidiary, RCN Business Solutions, with the acquisition of Con Edison Communications (CEC), a wholly owned subsidiary of Consolidated Edison Inc. RCN Business Solutions also built and operated its own fiber optic network in New York City.  This network leveraged the electric utility rights of way.

After acquiring NEON Communications in November 2007, RCN Business Solutions became RCN Metro Optical Networks, providing telecommunication services to enterprises and carrier customers. Founded in 1989 as FiveCom, NEON owned and operated a fiber optic network in twelve Northeastern and mid-Atlantic states and was a wholesale service provider of high bandwidth transport services to service providers and Fortune 100 companies.

In September 2010, RCN Metro Optical Networks re-launched as Sidera Networks. The change was a result of ABRY Partners, LLC’s acquisition of RCN Corporation on August 26, 2010.

Later that year, Sidera Networks made two additional acquisitions.  In November 2010, Sidera acquired Cross Connect Solutions, Inc. a Philadelphia-based colocation provider, adding  of colocation space to Sidera's existing portfolio.  In December 2010, Sidera Networks acquired Long Island Fiber Exchange] (LIFE), adding  of fiber and 550 lit buildings to its footprint.

On December 27, 2012, Sidera announced that it would merge with Lightower Fiber Networks in a transaction valued at over $2 billion led by Berkshire Partners, a Boston-based investment firm. Pamlico Capital, a significant Lightower investor, and ABRY Partners, a significant Sidera investor, will remain as investors in the new company. The combined company was led by then Lightower CEO, Rob Shanahan.

Investors
Based in Boston, Massachusetts, ABRY Partners, LLC is a media, communications, business, and information services-focused private equity investment firm. Since its founding in 1989, ABRY has completed over $27 billion of leveraged transactions and other private equity, mezzanine and preferred equity placements, representing investments in approximately 450 properties.

Footprint
Sidera Networks’ footprint includes: Albany, Baltimore, Boston, Burlington, Chicago, Hartford, Manchester, New York City, Long Island, Newark, Philadelphia, Portland, Providence, Washington D.C., London and Toronto.

Overview

Key PeopleMichael T. Sicoli, Chief Executive Officer; Clint Heiden, President; Edward O'Hara, Chief Financial Officer; Paul Eskildsen, Vice President & General Counsel; Lorin Dorco, Chief Technology Officer; Patrick O'Hare, Senior Vice President of Operations & Engineering; Kevin Mulqueen, Vice President of Colocation; Christopher Lowe, Vice President of Information Technology; Amy Long, Senior Director of Human Resources

ServicesEthernet, SONET, Wavelength, Internet Access, Colocation, Custom Private Optical Network, Dark Fiber Solutions, Xtreme Solution, Managed Services  Network Operations Center, Managed Router Services and Remote Hands

Fiber Miles: Approximately 450,000

Route Miles:  Approximately 12,500

On-Net Locations: Approximately 2,900

Colocation Facilities:30

References

Fiber-optic communications